Karipottan   is a river flowing in the Namakkal district of the Indian state of Tamil Nadu.

References

See also 
List of rivers of Tamil Nadu

Rivers of Tamil Nadu
Namakkal district
Rivers of India

ta:கரிபொட்டான் ஆறு